David Thalalla (born 28 August 1963) is a Malaysian former cricketer. A right-handed batsman and right-arm medium pace bowler, he played for the Malaysia national cricket team between 1994 and 1998.

Biography
Born in Kuala Lumpur in 1963, David Thalalla first played for Malaysia in the 1994 ICC Trophy in Nairobi. He next played in September 1995, playing in the annual Saudara Cup match against Singapore. He didn't play again until February 1998 when he played in the Stan Nagaiah Trophy series against Singapore.

After the Stan Nagaiah Trophy series, Thalalla made his List A debut, playing for Malaysia in the Wills Cup, a Pakistani domestic one-day competition. After playing in the Saudara Cup match in August, his last appearance for Malaysia was in the cricket tournament of the 1998 Commonwealth Games, hosted in his home city of Kuala Lumpur.

References

1963 births
Living people
Malaysian sportspeople of Indian descent
Malaysian Christians
Sportspeople from Kuala Lumpur
Malaysian cricketers
Cricketers at the 1998 Commonwealth Games
Commonwealth Games competitors for Malaysia